The 1998 WNBA season was the 2nd season for the Sacramento Monarchs. The team tied with the Utah Starzz for the worst record in the Western Conference.

Offseason
Tajama Abraham was picked up by the Detroit Shock in the 1998 WNBA Expansion Draft.

WNBA Draft

Trades

Regular season

Season standings

Season schedule

Player stats

References

Sacramento Monarchs seasons
Sacramento
Sacramento Monarchs